Habsiguda is a neighbourhood in Hyderabad, Telangana, India. It is located at the eastern end of the city between Tarnaka and Uppal. It forms Ward No. 7 of Greater Hyderabad Municipal Corporation.

History of Habsiguda 
The origin of the name Habsiguda may have originated from Habshi meaning African and guda a suffix for village; Habshi was a common term referring to the Siddi, Africans from Al-Habash (an Arabic term for Abbysinia or Ethiopia). This barren land was a Cattle ground for Nizams of Deccan Princely State, and was probably the home of the African troops in Nizam's military. Abyssinians used to be brought as slaves and later as laborers by Nizams to take care of their cattle. Habeesis (people from Abyssinia) lived for decades in and around this area hence the name "Habeesguda" and now being called as Habsiguda. Today one can still find these Abyssinians in many parts of Old City and especially in "Barkaas". Many of these people were mixed with local people and accepted in all communities.

Later Habsiguda was occupied by many construction and plantation labourers that were brought from surrounding districts to construct Osmania University by Mir Osman Ali Khan, Asaf Jah Vii (Last Nizam of Hyderabad Deccan).

Habsiguda remained as a hamlet under "Nacharam Village" until 1981 and later became an independent Grampanchayat under Uppal Kalan Municipality and now its part of Hyderabad Metropolitan City.

Research institutes 
Center for Cellular and Molecular Biology
Indian Institute of Chemical Technology
National Geophysical Research Institute
Central Food Technology Research Institute – Resource Center
Indian Statistical Institute

Transport 
The Hyderabad Metro Rail has a route covering from Nagole to Raidurg which is laid via Habsiguda.
Hyderabad Metro Rail Project is the World's Largest Public-Private Partnership Project (PPP) in the Metro Sector. The Hyderabad Metro Rail Network covers a total distance of around 72 Km. It has three Metro stops one at Cricket Stadium, second at National Geophysical Research Institute and other at Crossroads of Habsiguda.

Habsiguda is well connected by TSRTC buses. It is about 5 km from Secunderabad Railway Station and about 11 km from Hyderabad Nampally Railway Station of the South Central Railway. Rajiv Gandhi International Airport, Hyderabad is about 30 km away from Habsiguda. The closest MMTS Train station is 2.5 km away at Sitaphalmandi.

Late at night, shared autos/cabs keep moving Secunderabad and Uppal directions and provide an affordable alternative to metered autos which charge almost double fares at that time.

References 

Neighbourhoods in Hyderabad, India
Hyderabad State
Establishments in Hyderabad State
Municipal wards of Hyderabad, India
Siddhi people